Roselli is an Italian surname. Notable people with the surname include:

Auro Roselli (born 1921), Italian resistant, journalist, photographer, writer and inventor
Bernardo Roselli (born 1965), Uruguayan chess master
Bob Roselli (1931–2009), American professional baseball player
Ezio Roselli (1896–1963), Italian gymnast who competed in the 1920 Summer Olympics
Fabio Roselli (footballer) (born 1983), Italian professional football player
Fabio Roselli (rugby player) (born 1971), former Italian rugby union player and a current coach
Giorgio Roselli (born 1957), Italian professional football coach and a former player
Jimmy Roselli (1925–2011), Italian-American pop singer
John Roselli (1905–1976), influential mobster for the Chicago Outfit
Nahuel Roselli (born 1985), Argentine football defender
Nardia Roselli (born 1990), New Zealand netball player in the ANZ Championship
Romeo Roselli (born 1980), professional wrestler and actor best
Salvador Roselli, film director and screenplay writer
Warren S. Roselli (born 1979) Holy Father in Rome, Italy, Prince of House of Savoy, friend of Pope Francis.

See also
Italian ship Mario Roselli, Italian cargo ship, which sank on 11 October 1943 in Corfu Bay, killing some 1,302 Italian POWs

Italian-language surnames

es:Roselli